On February 19, 2022, an al-Shabaab suicide bomber killed 14 people at a restaurant in Beledweyne, Somalia.

Background

The Islamist militant group al-Shabaab – the Somali branch of al-Qaeda – began their insurgency during the 2006–2009 phase of the Somali Civil War. They took part in battles in Beledweyne, Hiran, Hirshabelle State in 2008, 2010 and 2011. In 2009, they carried out a suicide car bombing at a hotel there, killing 57 people. In 2013, they carried out suicide attacks there at a restaurant and a police station.

Bombing
During the morning of February 19, 2022, a suicide bomber detonated a bomb in a restaurant in Beledweyene. It killed 14 people – including a candidate in the same month's election – and injured at least another 12. On the same day, al-Shabaab claimed responsibility for the attack.

Aftermath

On 23 March 2022, two more suicide bombings killed over 30 people. The first one killed Amina Mohamed Abdi and many of her bodyguards, while the second was a car bombing against a hospital in Beledweyne.

See also
 Mogadishu bombing

References

2022 murders in Somalia
2020s building bombings
21st-century mass murder in Somalia
February 2022 crimes in Africa
February 2022 events in Africa
Attacks on buildings and structures in 2022
Islamic terrorist incidents in 2022
Mass murder in 2022
Suicide bombings in 2022
Terrorist incidents in Somalia in 2022
Al-Shabaab (militant group) attacks
Attacks on restaurants in Africa
Building bombings in Somalia
Suicide bombings in Somalia
Somali Civil War (2009–present)
Terrorist incidents in Beledweyne